Élie is the French equivalent of "Elie", "Elias" or "Elijah."

French masculine given name
 Élie Vinet (1509–1587) French Renaissance humanist
 Élie Diodati (1576–1661) Swiss French jurist
 Élie Benoist (1640–1728) French Protestant minister and historian of the Edict of Nantes
 Élie Bouhéreau (1643–1719) French Huguenot refugee in Ireland and the first librarian of Marsh's Library
 Élie, duc Decazes (1780–1860)
 Élie Bertrand (1713–1797) Swiss French geologist
 Élie Catherine Fréron (1719–1776) French (male) writer and controversialist
 Élie Lacoste (1745–1806) French politician during the French Revolution
 Élie Halévy (Chalfan) (1760–1826) French Hebrew poet and author
 Élie Frédéric Forey (1804–1872) Marshal of France
 Élie Berthet (1815–1891) French novelist
 Élie Lacerte (1821–1898) Quebec physician and political figure
 Élie Reclus (1827–1904) French anarchist and ethnographer
 Élie Mailloux (1830–1893) Quebec political figure
 Élie Ducommun (1833-1906) was winner of the 1902 Nobel Peace Prize
 Élie Saint-Hilaire (1839–1888) political figure in Quebec
 Élie Metchnikoff (1845–1916) Russian biologist, known by French name
 Élie Allégret (1865–1940), French Protestant pastor and missionary
 Élie Cartan (1869–1951) French mathematician
 Élie Halévy (1870–1937) French historian
 Élie Faure (1873–1937) French art historian
 Élie Lescot (1883–1974) President of Haiti from 1941
 Élie Bloncourt (1896–1978) Guadeloupe-born French politician of the 1930s.
 Élie Njoya (19..) African microbiologist, musician, writer
 Élie Bayol (1914–1995) French racing driver
 Élie de Rothschild (1917–2007) French banker
 Élie Wollman (1917–2008) French geneticist
 Élie Brousse (1921) French rugby league player
 Élie Fruchart (1922) French football player
 Élie Hoarau (1938) Réunion politician
 Élie Castor (1943–1996) French Guiana politician
 Élie Barnavi (born 1946) Israeli ambassador to France between 2000 and 2002.
 Élie Doté (1947) Prime Minister of the Central African Republic from June 2005 to January 2008
 Élie Chouraqui (1950) French film director
 Élie Lellouche (1952) French horse trainer
 Élie Baup (1955) French football player and now manager
 Élie Aboud (1959) Lebanese-French politician
 Élie Kakou (1960–1999) French comic actor
 Élie Domota (1963) trade union leader from Guadeloupe
 Élie Semoun (1963) French comedian
 Élie Kroupi (1979) French-Ivorian football player
 Élie Dohin (1983) French football midfielder 
 Élie Ehua (1992) French footballer
 Élie Dupuis (1994) Canadian actor

Double and middle names
 François-Élie Vincent (1708–1790) Swiss painter of portrait miniatures.
 Jean-Baptiste-Jacques Élie de Beaumont (1732–1786) French Protestant
 Médéric Louis Élie Moreau de Saint-Méry (1750–1819) Martinique creole colonist
 Marguerite-Élie Guadet (1758–1794) French (male) political figure of the Revolutionary period
 Jean-Baptiste Élie de Beaumont (1798–1874) French geologist
 Élie-Abel Carrière (1818–1896) French botanist
 Joseph-Élie Thibaudeau (1822–1878) Quebec businessman and political figure
 Jules-Élie Delaunay (1828–1891) French painter
 Marie Joseph Anatole Élie de Riquet (1858–1937) 19th Prince de Chimay, French fencer at the 1900 Summer Olympics
 Nil-Élie Larivière (1899–1969) Quebec politician
 Joseph Élie Cholette Canadian politician
 Jacques Derrida, born Jackie Élie Derrida (1930–2004) Sephardic French-Algerian philosopher

Variant spellings
Hélie and Hélias, also Élias:
 Hélie de Talleyrand-Périgord (cardinal) (1301–1364) also Élie de Talleyrand-Périgord, Bishop of Auxerre
 Hélias de Saint-Yrieix (died 1367) French Benedictine abbot, bishop and cardinal.
 Hélie de Bourdeilles (ca. 1423–1484) French Franciscan, Archbishop of Tours and cardinal.
 Élias Sarkis (1924-1985) President of Lebanon from 1976-1982.

Surname
 Antonio Élie (1893–1968) Canadian politician
 Romain Élie (1985) French football defender
 Louis-Pierre Hélie (1986) Canadian skier

Geographical names
 Saint-Élie a commune of French Guiana
 Rock Forest–Saint-Élie–Deauville, borough of Sherbrooke, Quebec
 Mont-Élie, Quebec, unorganized territory in the Capitale-Nationale region of Quebec
 Saint-Élie-de-Caxton municipality in the Mauricie region of the province

References

French masculine given names